Princess, At Your Orders! (French: Princesse, à vos ordres!) is a 1931 German romantic comedy film directed by Hanns Schwarz and Max de Vaucorbeil and starring Lilian Harvey, Henri Garat, and Jean Mercanton. It was produced by UFA as the French-language version of the studio's film Her Grace Commands. In the early years of sound films, before the practice of dubbing became widespread, it was common for a film to be reshot in multiple languages.

The film's sets were designed by the art director Erich Kettelhut.

Cast 
 Lilian Harvey as La princesse Marie-Christine
 Henri Garat as Carl de Berck
 Jean Mercanton as Le petit roi
 Marcel Vibert as Heynitz
 Bill Bocket as Pipac
 Raymond Guérin-Catelain as Le Prince de Leuchtenstein
 Théo Tony
 Marcel Merminod
 Comedian Harmonists as Les cuisiniers

References

Bibliography 
 Crisp, Colin. French Cinema—A Critical Filmography: Volume 1, 1929–1939, Volume 1; Volumes 1929–1939. Indiana University Press, 2015.

External links 
 

1931 films
1931 romantic comedy films
1930s French-language films
Films directed by Max de Vaucorbeil
Films directed by Hanns Schwarz
UFA GmbH films
German multilingual films
German romantic comedy films
German black-and-white films
1931 multilingual films
1930s German films